Coastliner 700 is a bus service operated in West Sussex and south east Hampshire, England, by Stagecoach South between Brighton and Portsmouth via Hove, Shoreham-by-Sea, Worthing, Littlehampton, Wick, Bognor Regis, Chichester, Havant, and Portsmouth with a general daytime frequency of every 15 minutes.	The route has its own livery and is usually operated with double-decker buses.

History
The route was introduced in 1975, as the 'Stagecoach 700' operated by Southdown Motor Services, a subsidiary of the state-owned National Bus Company (NBC). A similar route numbered 31 had existed since the 1920s, but was broken up into shorter routes in the early 1970s to improve reliability; the 700 initially ran as a limited stop service to avoid the same reliability issues. It was operated by ECW bodied Bristol VRs and Charles H Roe / Park Royal bodied Leyland Atlanteans. Southdown became an independent operator following the privatisation of NBC in 1986, and was taken over by the Stagecoach Group in 1989.

In 2006 the route, by now operated by the Stagecoach South division, was upgraded as part of a partnership between Stagecoach and several local authorities led by West Sussex County Council. The partnership, initially marketed as "coastal fastway", included the introduction of new vehicles and electronic passenger information systems with the aim of increasing passenger numbers by 50% in five years. The upgrade provoked some criticism from Derek Deedman, county councillor for the Bramber Castle area, for failing to include benefits to other services linking the coast to towns such as Steyning.

Further upgrades, initially centred on Shoreham-by-Sea before being extended to the section of route between Worthing and Brighton, were announced in 2009, including bus priority measures at busy road junctions. By 2010 the service carried four million people per year; in 2012, this figure was 4.9 million. Stagecoach introduced new vehicles in March 2010.

The service has had its own livery from the beginning. It began with a coloured strip along the side of the green Southdown bus; now it is the regular Stagecoach livery, blue, white, orange and red, with the route description on the side, with individual buses having livery related to a certain town along the route, and slogans such as 'We took the Coastliner 700 to fun and fashion'.

Since May 2014, the Coastliner has been split into three services. One route runs between Brighton and Littlehampton, with the services extending to Wickbourne, just North of Littlehampton, another between Littlehampton and Chichester and a third between Chichester and Portsmouth. Other changes made at the same time included a higher frequency of service between Chichester and Portsmouth and between Littlehampton and Arundel, and the introduction of later evening journeys.

Since April 2017, the Coastliner service no longer serves the tourist town of Arundel.  Instead, the town is now served by an hourly service Number 9 to Littlehampton, Shoreham-by-Sea, and Holmbush Shopping Centre.  This connects with the Coastliner at Littlehampton.

At the end of May 2021, Stagecoach applied their new yellow and gold 'long distance' brand to Coastliner buses and their associated publicity.

Route
The route is operated from three Stagecoach depots, Worthing, Chichester and Portsmouth, and since 2010 has run with branded Alexander Dennis Enviro 400 and Alexander Dennis Enviro 300 vehicles. The route has a peak vehicle requirement of 47. Twelve new vehicles were delivered in 2014.
In 2018, 30 Newer Alexander Dennis Enviro400 MMC were ordered to run between Littlehampton and Brighton due to the Low Emission Zone being introduced to Brighton City Centre.

See also
 The Wave, another South Coast route running from Dover to Eastbourne

References

External links

 

700 Coastliner
Transport in Brighton and Hove
Transport in Portsmouth
Transport in West Sussex
1975 establishments in England